Alva Woods (1794–1887) was an American minister, university professor and university president. He was interim President of Brown University, 1826–28 and President of Transylvania University, 1828-31.  Of most historical significance, he served as the first President of the University of Alabama from 1831 to 1837.

Biography

Early life
Alva Woods was born on August 13, 1794, in Shoreham, Vermont. He was raised as a Baptist. He studied at Phillips Academy in Andover, Massachusetts, graduating in 1813. He graduated from Harvard in 1817 and entered the Andover Theological Seminary, from which he graduated in September 1821. He was ordained in October 1821.

Career
Woods became a professor at the new Columbian College in Washington, D.C.  In 1824, he became professor of mathematics and natural philosophy at Brown, where he was interim President (1826–27). In 1828 he became president of Transylvania University.

In 1831 Woods accepted the presidency of the University of Alabama.  He resigned from the University of Alabama in 1837, becoming a prison minister. He died in Providence, Rhode Island, on September 6, 1887.

References

1794 births
1887 deaths
People from Shoreham, Vermont
Phillips Academy alumni
Brown University faculty
Presidents of Transylvania University
Presidents of the University of Alabama
Baptist ministers from the United States
Columbian College of Arts and Sciences faculty
Presidents of Brown University
Harvard University alumni
Andover Theological Seminary alumni
19th-century American clergy